Jerzy Hawrylewicz (22 December 195813 February 2009) was a Polish former professional footballer who played as a forward for Grunwald Choszczno (1977), Arkonia Szczecin (1977–1978), Stal Stocznia Szczecin (1978–1984), Pogoń Szczecin (1984–1987), and VfB Oldenburg (1987–1992). On 20 April 1992, during the match against Hannoverscher SC, the then 33-year-old collapsed on the pitch with a heart attack. He suffered from persistent vegetative state syndrome and hovered between consciousness and a kind of deep sleep until he died on 13 February 2009.

Career
Hawrylewicz joined VfB Oldenburg of the Oberliga Nord from Pogoń Szczecin. He contributed to the club's promotion to the 2. Bundesliga in 1990, being the club's most prolific scorer with 15 goals in 32 matches. He made eleven appearances in the 2. Bundesliga.

External links

References

1958 births
2009 deaths
People from Choszczno County
Sportspeople from West Pomeranian Voivodeship
Polish footballers
Association football forwards
Stal Szczecin players
Pogoń Szczecin players
VfB Oldenburg players
2. Bundesliga players
Polish expatriate footballers
Expatriate footballers in Germany
Polish expatriate sportspeople in Germany